Christian Mauvezin Perna (born 31 March 1984) is a former Uruguayan footballer that played for C.A. Rentistas and Villa Española in his country and Cobresal in the Chilean Primera División.

External links
 
 Tenfield Digital Profile 

1984 births
Living people
Uruguayan people of French descent
Uruguayan footballers
Uruguayan expatriate footballers
Villa Española players
C.A. Rentistas players
Cobresal footballers
Chilean Primera División players
Expatriate footballers in Chile
Association football midfielders